Jacques Meyer, known as Henri Meyer and Reyem (6 March 1841, in Mulhouse – 18 July 1899, in Thiais) was a French caricaturist and illustrator; best known for his work with the publishing firm of Hetzel, where he produced engravings for the works of Jules Verne.

He also designed numerous illustrations for periodicals; including a large number of covers for the Supplément illustré of Le Petit Journal, which were engraved by Fortuné Méaulle.

He was named a Chevalier in the Legion of Honor in 1884.

His son, who went by the name Jan-Méjan, was also a designer and illustrator.

Selected works

References

External links 

 Covers for Le Sifflet (The Whistle) @ heidlCON

1841 births
1899 deaths
French caricaturists
French illustrators
Artists from Mulhouse